The Most Worshipful National Grand Lodge Free & Accepted Ancient York Masons Prince Hall Origin National Compact USA (also referred to as Prince Hall Origin as well as Compact Masons) is a body of Masonry in the United States of America composed predominantly of African American Freemasons. The body to govern Grand Lodges within the United States.

Declaration of Sentiments
The National Grand Lodge was established June 24, 1847 in Boston, Massachusetts, by Grand Lodges which were of direct lineage to African Lodge No. 459. Those Grand Lodges were the African Grand Lodge of Massachusetts, First Independent African Grand Lodge of Pennsylvania and Hiram Grand Lodge of Pennsylvania. Delegates of Boyer Lodge of New York (which was a subordinate of African Grand Lodge) were also a part of the June 24, 1847, convention. It is contended by scholars that Boyer Lodge and other Lodges in New York did not form a National Grand Lodge subordinate Grand Lodge. This is in contrast to the report by Joshua Woodlin and is corroborated by newspaper accounts of the activities of United Grand Lodge of New York in 1848. It is also important to note that according to both primary sources of Woodlin and Lux et Veritas, Alexander Elston, whom is referenced for New York not joining the National was a National Grand Lodge officer (National Grand Sword Bearer) The primary purpose of the meeting was to heal tensions between the two Pennsylvania Grand Lodges and to unify the bodies of African American Freemasons in light of them being excluded from the predominantly white Freemasonry in the United States. The National Grand Lodge approved its Declaration of Sentiments which were as follows:

Sentiment One
"The question has been asked the cause of the separate organizations of white and black Masons in the United States of America. We do not know of any good reason why there should be, and we have made several attempts without success to have but one. We are, and always have been, in procession of all the ancient landmarks and regulations of the craft, and we do acknowledge all genuine Masons of all Nations and complexion to be our brethren."

Sentiment Two
"THEREFORE, in pursuance of the above call, we have met in the city of Boston, State Massachusetts, in the year and date above-mentioned, and do form in solemn convention and say before the world our sentiments thereon."

Sentiment Three
"In all stages of oppression we have petitioned for redress, but found none; therefore, in solemn convention assembled, we do, in the name of the Great Masonic Body of Free and Accepted A.Y. Masons, declare ourselves a free and independent body of Masons, to be known as the National Grand Lodge of Color of these United States of America and Masonic Jurisdiction, with full power to grant Letters of Dispensation and Warrants to all State Grand Lodges under our Jurisdiction, and that the said State Grand Lodges shall have full power to grant letters of dispensation and warrants to the subordinate Lodges under the several jurisdictions, and to establish as many Lodges as they may deem most expedient."

Sentiment Four
"Not that we have been wanting in attention to our white Brethren. We have from time to time solicited them to extend their jurisdiction over us, but to no effect. We, therefore, the delegates of the several Lodges throughout the United States, in convention assembled, appealing to the Supreme Judge of the world for the rectitude of our intentions, do in the name and by the authority of our constituents, declare and publish the said National Grand Lodge of Color of the United States to be a free and independent body, with full power, as named in third article of this declaration, and for the support of the declaration, with a firm reliance on the protection of Divine Providence, we mutually pledge ourselves to each other in the solemn ties of brotherhood."

John T. Hilton was elected the first National Grand Master and the Grand Lodges which were part of the Convention were designated to be restructured by National Grand Master Hilton. The African Grand Lodge was restructured and renamed the Right Worshipful Prince Hall Grand Lodge of Massachusetts by virtue of warrant from the National Grand Lodge.

The First Independent African Grand Lodge of Pennsylvania and Hiram Grand Lodge of Pennsylvania merged and formed the Right Worshipful Grand Lodge of Pennsylvania. All subordinates of these Grand Lodges in other states united and subsequently formed Grand Lodges all under the warrant and authority of the National Grand Lodge. The National Grand Lodge between 1847 and 1878 warranted the majority of Grand Lodges of African American Freemasons.

Lineage and Daughter Grand Lodges
All Prince Hall Affiliated Grand Lodges trace their lineage to African Lodge No. 459 of Massachusetts through the National Grand Lodge. Masonic author Alton Roundtree said the following: "The National Grand Lodge was formed by three Grand Lodges that had lineage to African Lodge No. 459. Thus it had lineage to African Lodge when it was formed." These facts supported by the literature on the subject are one of contention among debate circles.

All Grand Lodges with lineage to African Lodge No. 459 were established in either of the following ways: 
a. By Warrant of the National Grand Lodge.
b. By three Lodges that were established as National Grand Lodge subordinates.
c. By merger (as Equals) of Independent and National Grand Lodges subordinate Grand Lodges.
d. Independent PHA Grand Lodges with lineage to either a., b., or c.

This lineage has been, most recently acknowledged by the Prince Hall Conference of Grand Masters which stated in 2012:

Committee on Bogus Masonry, MWGM Robert E. Joseph (IA) Chaired this Committee. "In essence the Committee stated there are only two legal Masonic bodies in the United States of America:

-The Grand Lodges that can prove authority from the Grand Lodge of Massachusetts organized by Henry Price in July 1733 (White Masons)

-All Grand Lodges tracking their lineage to African Lodge No. 459 organized by Prince Hall from March 1775 (African American Masons)

Thus said, if we intend to have a relationship of some kind then we recommend that we focus on Prince Hall Origin Grand Lodges who can trace their lineage to African Lodge No. 459 and develop an approach to convince them that Prince Hall Masonry is the way to go.  The first step is to stop the name calling.  Second, open a dialogue with PHO bodies. The Committee report was approved."

-The following are several Prince Hall Affiliated Grand Lodges which were established by warrant of the National Grand Lodge:

The MW Prince Hall Grand Lodge of Massachusetts
The Most Worshipful Prince Hall Grand Lodge of Massachusetts was established by the National Grand Lodge in April 1848 under John T. Hilton who served as the First National Grand Master.

The MW Prince Hall Grand Lodge of Ohio
The Most Worshipful Prince Hall Grand Lodge of Ohio was established by Lodges under the National Grand Lodge in 1849 and was warranted by the National Grand Lodge June 24, 1850.

The MW Prince Hall Grand Lodge of Ontario
The Most Worshipful Grand Lodge of Ontario was established as the MW Widow's Son Grand Lodge of the Province of Ontario Canada, August 25, 1856 under warrant of the National Grand Lodge

The MW Prince Hall Grand Lodge of Indiana
The Most Worshipful Prince Hall Grand Lodge of Indiana was established September 13, 1856 by warrant of the National Grand Lodge

The MW Prince Hall Grand Lodge of Illinois
The Most Worshipful Prince Hall Grand Lodge of Illinois was established May 6, 1867 by Warrant of the National Grand Lodge,

The MW Prince Hall Grand Lodge of Kentucky
The Most Worshipful Prince Hall Grand Lodge of Kentucky was established by warrant of the National Grand Lodge January 31, 1867 

The MW Prince Hall Grand Lodge of North Carolina
In 1866, under authority of the Grand Lodge of New York, Past Grand Master Paul Drayton organized King Solomon Lodge #23 (now #1,) at New Bern, North Carolina, and Giblem Lodge #28 (now #2,) at Wilmington, North Carolina. By authority of the same Grand Lodge, Past Grand Master James W. Hood, who had been appointed as supervisor, organized in 1867, Eureka Lodge #30 (now #3,) at Fayetteville, North Carolina, and Widow's Son Lodge #31, (now #4,) at Raleigh, North Carolina. The four lodges last mentioned, on March 1, 1870, met in Giblem Lodge room in the city of Wilmington, and organized the present Most Worshipful Grand Lodge of the state of North Carolina with M:. W:. J:. W:. Hood, Grand Master, and R:. W:. J:. J:. Sawyer as Grand Secretary. 

The MW Stringer Grand Lodge PHA of Mississippi
The Most Worshipful Stringer Grand Lodge of Mississippi was established by Warrant of the National Grand Lodge October 22, 1875

Schisms 
In 1849, seven Lodges under the Right Worshipful Grand Lodge of Pennsylvania (Union Lodge No. 4, Sheba Lodge No. 7, Fidelity Lodge No. 8, Harmony Lodge No. 10, Prudence Lodge No. 11, Christian Lodge No. 12, Paxton Lodge No. 16) met at the Lodge Hall at Seventh Street in Philadelphia and voted to sever all ties with the National Grand Lodge. These Lodges along with the Grand Master of the Right Worshipful Grand Lodge of Pennsylvania, Jacob Jenkins, a month later, were "expelled" by the National Grand Lodge. In the same year the United Grand Lodge of New York was expelled by the National Grand Lodge for not recognizing the authority of the National Grand Lodge.

Declarations of Independence 
In 1869, the Grand Lodge of Ohio, under the jurisdiction of the National Grand Lodge, withdrew from their authority and styled itself as an independent Grand Lodge. The Grand Lodge of Washington D.C. did the same. These two Grand Lodges were in consequence expelled by the National Grand Lodge. The Right Worshipful Grand Lodge of Ohio had far-reaching sympathy and support due to the many Lodges established by Ohio in other states. Through the influences of foreign correspondence by men such as William T. Boyd and others, many other Grand Lodges under the jurisdiction of the National Grand Lodge withdrew or engaged in mergers as independent Grand Lodges. These Grand Lodges are now styled as Prince Hall Affiliates (PHA).

Matthews Manifesto 
Captain William D. Matthews, the eighth National Grand Master of the National Grand Lodge, fed up with the actions of those Grand Lodges which left the National Grand Lodge, gave orders for all the Grand Lodges which withdrew to return to the fold of the National Grand Lodge or be expelled and have new Grand Masters commissioned in those particular states and re-organized and National Grand Lodge state subordinates would be established. This was popularly called the "Matthews Manifesto" and was generally ignored by those Grand Lodges that withdrew. The Grand Lodges that remained with the National Grand Lodge along with those states re-organized by Matthews following the manifesto formed what is now styled as Prince Hall Origin – National Compact (PHO).

Current structure 
The National Grand Lodge convenes triennially and is the legislative, executive and judicial body of all subordinates of its jurisdiction. The National Grand Lodge has had 21 Past National Grand Masters.

Past National Grand Masters

References

External links 
 
 National Grand Lodge Historical & Research Society website

1847 establishments in Massachusetts
Grand Lodges
Organizations established in 1847
Prince Hall Freemasonry